The Ministry of Education and Higher Education (in French: Ministère de l’Éducation et de l'Enseignement supérieur, abbreviated as MEES) is the government ministry of Quebec that governs education, recreation, and sports.

The minister is the individual who has the political responsibility for the regulation and oversight of educational services offered in the province as well as for the Ministry of Education.

History
The Quebec government abolished the Ministry of Public Instruction in 1875 to submit to the ultramontane Roman Catholic clergy which considered education the domain of the family and the Church, not the state.

Under the new provincial government of Premier Jean Lesage, in 1964 a Ministry of Education was established with Paul Gérin-Lajoie appointed the first Minister of Education since 1875.

For the majority of the time since the creation of the position, the minister has been responsible for both the period including up to and including secondary education and post-secondary education.

Ministers of education

Ministers of higher education  
Between 1984 and 1994, a second cabinet position was dedicated to higher education in addition to the position responsible for primary and secondary education. Premier Pauline Marois has restored this function with the nomination of Pierre Duchesne on September 19, 2012. Following the 2014 election, the function was re-merged with Education.

It was re-created in 2016 following Pierre Moreau's leave of absence for health reasons, in which his responsibilities were divided. Under François Legault's  Coalition Avenir Québec government elected in 2018, the position was briefly re-merged again, but reinstated in June 2020 as part of a shuffle.

The following persons have served as Quebec's Minister of Higher Education, Science, and Technology.

Further reading 
 Hunte K. D. (1964). The Ministry of Public Instruction in Québec:  1867-1875, Ph.D. thesis, McGill University

References

External links 

 Ministry of Education, Recreation and Sports
 Ministry of Education, Recreation and Sports 
   Minister's Official Webpage (in French)
 

Education
Quebec
Quebec
Education in Quebec